The Guadalajara rebellion of 1823 was an armed conflict led by the Jalisco government after the fall of the First Mexican Empire and the victory of the Casa Mata Plan Revolution.

Mutiny and decree 
When the province of Guadalajara pronounced its independence through its provisional Board in a manifesto in which it opposed the Congress, the municipalities of that territory were exalted to establish a federal republic. As a result of this, on May 12 a tremendous disorder was carried out that attested to the disagreement that still existed among the population, since while some shouted through the streets the return of Iturbide others supported the republic . Such a movement caused the political chief to send some troops to the mutineers, causing bloodshed. Following these events, the Provincial Council decreed:

Rebellion 
To all the pronouncements, the Executive Power and the Congress called for the formation of a new Congress that with wider powers constituted the nation under the system of indirect election, assigning a deputy to every 50 000 inhabitants or to the fractions that passed 40 000. With this measure most of the provinces returned to calm, however, Guadalajara was preparing to resist, being necessary the use of military force to reduce the uprising. An expedition commanded by General Nicolás Bravo was arranged and as second to Pedro Celestino Negrete .

Consequences 
The expedition was a success, taking General Negrete Colima and getting the entire district back to order, becoming from that moment as the territory of the nation . Bravo, meanwhile, arranged things satisfactorily and returned to Guanajuato in case the circumstances required him to take another point in the country.

References 
 RIVA PALACIO, Vicente (1940). Mexico through the centuries: general and complete history of social, political, religious, military, artistic, scientific and literary development of Mexico from ancient times to the present time; work, unique in its kind. (GS López edition). Mexico.

Wars involving Mexico
History of Mexico
Conflicts in 1823